Piu Marie Eatwell (born November 6, 1970) is a British-Indian author based in Paris, France. She is best known for her true-crime book, Black Dahlia, Red Rose. It was referred to in The New York Times as one of the best true-crime stories. She is also the author of They Eat Horses, Don't They? The Truth About The French, which won the 2014 Next Generation Indie Award for multicultural nonfiction.

Career 
She wrote and published her first book in 2013, They Eat Horses, Don't They? The Truth About The French. It was received positively, and was reviewed by The Guardian, The New York Times, Daily Mail, and The Spectator. She then wrote two more books, The Dead Duke, His Secret Wife, and the Missing Corpse, and F is for France: A Curious Cabinet of French Wonders in 2014 and 2016 respectively before her publishing her nonfiction book, Black Dahlia, Red Rose in 2017, covering the case of the Black Dahlia.

Publications 
 They Eat Horses, Don't They? The Truth About The French (2013) – 
 The Dead Duke, His Secret Wife, and the Missing Corpse (2014) – 
 F is for France: A Curious Cabinet of French Wonders (2016) – 
 Black Dahlia, Red Rose (2017) –

References 

1970 births
Living people
British people of Indian descent
British expatriates in France
British women novelists
British women non-fiction writers
21st-century British novelists
21st-century British non-fiction writers
21st-century British women writers